Vernon George Prins (14 April 1924 – 31 July 2003) was a Sri Lankan cricketer who captained the Ceylon team in first-class matches from 1955–56 to 1959–60.

School and club career
Prins attended S. Thomas' College, Mount Lavinia, where he played for the First XI for several years, captaining the team in 1942–43. He captained Nondescripts Cricket Club in the P Saravanamuttu Trophy from 1952 to 1959, leading them to five premierships, and scoring 5611 runs at an average of 45.25 and taking 322 wickets at 15.60. In 1954-55 Nondescripts played The Rest (that is, Rest of Ceylon) in a three-day match at the Nondescripts ground. Prins took 5 for 11 and 6 for 41 and Nondescripts won by 320 runs.

Career for Ceylon
Prins played for Ceylon from 1944–45 to 1959–60, captaining the national team from 1955–56 to 1959–60. His best performances came in consecutive matches for the Gopalan Trophy. In 1957-58 he took 5 for 48 and 3 for 52, and in 1958-59 he took 6 for 85 and 2 for 44. He also made his highest first-class score in the Gopalan Trophy, 74 in 1953–54.

He worked as a police inspector. He also represented Ceylon at hockey.

References

External links
 Vernon Prins at Cricinfo
 Vernon Prins at CricketArchive
 "Vernon Prins, Prince of Sri Lanka Cricket"
 "Ivers, Vernon and Artie right at the top"

1924 births
2003 deaths
Alumni of S. Thomas' College, Mount Lavinia
All-Ceylon cricketers
Sri Lankan field hockey players